Bolzano Airport  is a small regional airport near Bolzano in the province of South Tyrol in northern Italy.

History
The airport was created in October 1926 with a 1300-meter landing runway.

In June 2016, a public opinion poll decided to no longer support the highly deficient airport with money from the government. Therefore, it was decided that the airport's operator company would be liquidated and the licence given back to the Italian authorities, which means the airport would be shut down entirely if no other operator were found.

South Tyrol spent over €120 million in recent years for the airport without attracting any lasting scheduled traffic. Darwin Airline ceased their PSO-flights to Rome on behalf of Alitalia on 18 June 2015 leaving Bolzano Airport again without any scheduled commercial traffic.

In 2019, the South Tyrol government sold the airport to ABD Holding, a private company of entrepreneurs Josef Gostner, René Benko and Hans Peter Haselsteiner, for a price of 3.8 million euros. The airport extended its runway to 1,462 m in late 2021.

In March 2021, a helicopter owned by the Gardia di Finanza, crash landed at the airport. The helicopter was quite new.

Airlines and destinations
The following airlines operate regular scheduled and charter flights at Bolzano Airport:

Statistics

See also
List of airports in Italy

References

External links

 Official website
 

Airport
Bolzano